William Cowper (28 December 1778 – 6 July 1858) was an English-born Anglican cleric in Australia who was the Archdeacon of Cumberland. His son also named William Cowper was later the Dean of Sydney.

Early life
Cowper was born at Whittington, Lancashire, the son of a yeoman farmer. At 17 years of age, Cowper became a tutor in a cleric's family. Later he was a clerk in the royal engineer's department at Hull. He was ordained in March 1808 and became a curate in Rawdon near Hull. There he was found by the Reverend Samuel Marsden who induced him to come to Australia.

Australia
Early in 1808 Rev. Samuel Marsden, in search of two additional chaplains, came to Cowper's parish and invited him to accept appointment. He was willing and received a commission as an assistant chaplain in New South Wales at a salary of £260. His departure from England was delayed by the death of his wife, then the mother of three sons, including Charles, later a leading politician, and one daughter. Cowper married Ann Barrell, and sailed with his family to Port Jackson, arriving in August 1809. He took up duties as minister of St Philip's Church, then being completed. For the first ten years of his ministry, he was the only clergyman permanently in Sydney.
Cowper arrived at Sydney on 18 August 1809 and became an assistant chaplain. He was also incumbent of St Phillip's Church (the name was spelt this way in honour of the first Governor of New South Wales, Arthur Phillip). He found the state of morality in Sydney deplorable and actively set to work by preaching and, by example, to bring about an improvement. He was one of the founders and secretary of the Benevolent Society of New South Wales and was at one time the secretary of six religious and charitable societies. In 1842 Cowper's eyesight began to fail; he obtained leave of absence to go to London to have an operation and was presented with a purse of £780 by his parishioners to cover his expenses. He returned in 1843 with his sight much improved and with a Lambeth degree of Doctor of Divinity which had been conferred on him by the Archbishop of Canterbury. In 1848 Cowper was instrumental in starting the building of the new church of St Philip and gave £500 towards the cost of it. In 1849 he had a dangerous illness but recovered, and in 1852 was appointed to administer the diocese during the absence of Bishop Broughton on a visit to England. The bishop died in February 1853 and Cowper had to continue his duties until Bishop Barker arrived in May 1855.

Late life
The new church of St Philip was sufficiently complete to be consecrated in March 1856, much to Cowper's joy. He died on 6 July 1858. He was married three times and was survived by four sons and two daughters. Two of his sons, Sir Charles Cowper and William Macquarie Cowper, are noticed separately.

Cowper was devoted to his work. He several times refused to become a magistrate because he considered the duties incompatible with his clerical life.

The burden of Cowper's clerical and official duties took their toll. In 1812 he had suffered from some form of rheumatic fever, probably contracted in the gaols, and his slow recovery marked the beginning of a life of constant ill health. Reports of this ill health were made in 1818 and 1829 by William Grant Broughton, Marsden and Darling, but it was not until February 1842 that the formation of cataracts on both eyes compelled him to take leave and return to England for treatment. The loss in 1831 of his second wife, mother of William Macquarie Cowper, had also told on him. On 1 March 1836 he had married Harriette Swaine, to whom were born two further children. The address of farewell and appreciation presented to him on his departure from Sydney by his parishioners and the citizens of Sydney revealed the esteem in which he was held, and the gift that went with it paid all the expenses of his journey to England. The treatment of his eyes seems to have been entirely successful and he was able to return to his duties. While in England he received a Lambeth D.D. In 1848 Bishop Broughton collated him to the archdeaconry of Cumberland.

References

N. S. Pollard, 'Cowper, William (1778 - 1858)', Australian Dictionary of Biography, Volume 1, MUP, 1966, pp 254–256.

Peter G. Bolt, William Cowper (1778-1858). The Indispensable Parson. The Life and Influence of Australia's First Parish Clergyman (Camperdown, NSW: Bolt Publishing Services, 2009)

External links
 
 

1778 births
1858 deaths
19th-century English Anglican priests
Anglican archdeacons in Australia